Nutbag is the debut EP by American funk rock band Hot Action Cop. It was released in 2002 and was only available to purchase at live shows or by direct order from the band.

Track listing

External links
 http://www.last.fm/music/Hot+Action+Cop/Nutbag+Ep
 http://www.purevolume.com/hotactioncop/albums/Nutbag+EP

2002 debut EPs
Hot Action Cop albums